Meisenthal (Lorraine Franconian: Meisedal) is a commune in the Moselle department of the Grand Est administrative region in north-eastern France.

The village belongs to the Pays de Bitche and to the Northern Vosges Regional Nature Park. As of the 2013 France census, the village's population is 697. The inhabitants of the commune are known as Val-Mésangeois and Val-Mésangeoises.

The village is famous for the Centre International d'Art Verrier (CIAV; international center for studio glass). Glass has been produced in Meisenthal since the early 18th century, and since the 19th century Christmas decorations from Meisenthal were famous. It has been suggested that in the mid 19th century a shortage of apples inspired the local glass blowers to produce baubles to be used as decorations for Christmas trees instead.

See also
 Émile Gallé
 Communes of the Moselle department

References

External links

 Centre International d’Art Verrier (CIAV)

Communes of Moselle (department)